Luíz Carlos Martins Moreira (born 5 July 1985), simply known as Luíz Carlos is a Brazilian footballer who plays as a defensive midfielder in Portugal for Paços de Ferreira.

Club career
In the summer of 2016, Luíz Carlos signed for Al-Ahli Saudi FC

Honours
S.C. Braga
 Taça de Portugal: 2015-16

Al-Ahli
Saudi Super Cup: 2016

References

External links
 
 

1985 births
Living people
Sportspeople from Espírito Santo
Brazilian footballers
Brazilian expatriate footballers
Association football midfielders
Campeonato Brasileiro Série B players
Primeira Liga players
Liga Portugal 2 players
Saudi Professional League players
Süper Lig players
Ipatinga Futebol Clube players
S.C. Freamunde players
F.C. Paços de Ferreira players
S.C. Braga players
Al-Ahli Saudi FC players
Ankaraspor footballers
Expatriate footballers in Portugal
Brazilian expatriate sportspeople in Portugal
Expatriate footballers in Saudi Arabia
Brazilian expatriate sportspeople in Saudi Arabia
Expatriate footballers in Turkey